Fidalgo is an unincorporated community in Skagit County, in the U.S. state of Washington.

History
A post office called Fidalgo was established in 1870, and remained in operation until 1910. The community takes its name from nearby Fidalgo Bay.

References

Unincorporated communities in Skagit County, Washington
Unincorporated communities in Washington (state)